Wildwood Cemetery and Mary Lyon Fisher Memorial Chapel is a historic cemetery and chapel located at Lyons Falls in Lewis County, New York.  The cemetery was established in 1906, and the chapel constructed in 1921.  It remains an active burial ground containing 736 marked burials. The memorial chapel is a two-story, masonry building in the Late Gothic Revival style designed by Utica architects Gouge & Ames.  It consists of a rectangular main section, measuring 19 feet by 24 feet, with a rear chancel addition measuring 9 feet by 15 feet.  Also in the cemetery is a contributing plaque to Caleb Lyon Sr.

It was listed on the National Register of Historic Places in 2011.

References

Cemeteries on the National Register of Historic Places in New York (state)
Gothic Revival architecture in New York (state)
1810 establishments in New York (state)
Churches completed in 1921
Buildings and structures in Lewis County, New York
National Register of Historic Places in Lewis County, New York